Sir Henry Paul Harvey  (born Durant; 1 October 1869 – 30 December 1948) was a British diplomat and editor of literary reference works. He compiled The Oxford Companion to English Literature (1932), the first of the Oxford Companions series.

Life
Born in Paris, Harvey was the illegitimate child of the French sculptor Henri Joseph François, Baron de Triqueti  and the English sculptor Susan Durant. After his mother died in 1873 when he was 4 years old, he was brought up by Blanche Lee Childe, his aunt or half-sister; when Childe also died in 1886, he was sponsored by Augusta, Lady Gregory with help from Henry James. Educated at Rugby School and New College, Oxford, he married Ethel Frances Persse, daughter of Col. Edward Persse, in 1896.

Harvey was (Assistant) Private Secretary to the Marquess of Lansdowne, Secretary of State for War, from 1895 to 1900. He was Egyptian Financial Advisor from 1907 to 1912 and 1919 to 1920. He was appointed a Companion of the Order of the Bath (CB) in 1901 and a Knight Commander of the Order of St Michael and St George (KCMG) in 1911.

Prompted by a suggestion of Kenneth Sisam at the Oxford University Press, Harvey compiled the Oxford Companion to English Literature, the first of the Oxford Companions. He subsequently compiled the Companion to Classical Literature, and was working on the Companion to French Literature at the time of his death.

Works
 The Oxford Companion to English Literature, 1932
 The Oxford Companion to Classical Literature, 1937
 The Oxford Companion to French Literature, 1959 (with Janet E. Heseltine)

References

1869 births
1948 deaths
British diplomats
Companions of the Order of the Bath
Knights Commander of the Order of St Michael and St George
Literary scholars
Alumni of New College, Oxford
People educated at Rugby School